Otro Rollo (officially Otro rollo con: Adal Ramones) (lit. Another roll, meaning other stuff) is a Mexican sketch comedy and variety television show, broadcast live on Televisa on Tuesday nights. Hosted by Adal Ramones, it began airing in May 13, 1995 and finished on May 8, 2007, after twelve years on air.

The show featured an opening monologue, comedy sketches, celebrity interviews and live musical performances by various artists.

In the United States, it aired on Univision.

Cast members 
Adal Ramones - Host 
Yordi Rosado - Co-host/Reporter
Mauricio Castillo
Fabiola Campomanes - (1995–1996)
Roxana Castellanos - (1996–2006) 
Consuelo Duval - (1998–2000)
Jorge Alejandro - (1999–2007)
Eduardo España - (1999–2006) 
Gabriela Platas- (2000–2006) 
Manola Diez - (2003–2007) 
Yuliana Peniche - (2006–2007) 
Samia Bracamonte - (2006–2007) 
Eddy Vargas - (2006–2007) 
Luis Orozco - (2006–2007) 
Tamara Vargas - (2006–2007)
Luigi & Benji Mercury - Show acrobats
Abel Membrillo - Announcer

Otro Rollo Band
 Musical directors - José Zavala (1999–2007), Chema Frías (1995–1999)
 Saxophone - Juan Antonio Ramos
 Trombone - Erick Rodríguez
 Trumpet - Gabriel Ramos and Carlos González
 Drums and Keyboard - Rudy Sánchez and Charly Saade
 Percussions - Raúl Oviedo
 Bass guitar - Jorge Zavala and Ricardo Rocha

References
Otro Rollo Official Website 

Mexican sketch comedy television series
Variety television series
1995 Mexican television series debuts
2007 Mexican television series endings